Cornutella may refer to:
 Cornutella (mite), a genus of acari in the family Labidostommatidae
 Cornutella (radiolarian), a genus of radiolarians in the family Theoperidae